Following is the discography of the New Orleans, Louisiana-based rock band Cowboy Mouth.

Albums

Studio albums

Live albums

Extended plays

References 

Discographies of American artists
Cowboy Mouth discography